National Medical Fellowships, Inc. (NMF) is a nonprofit organization in the United States that provides scholarships and support for underrepresented students in medicine and the health professions.

Founded 1946, NMF has provided over $45 million to more than 32,000 students underrepresented in medicine. The organization offers need-based and merit scholarships to Black, Indigenous, People of Color (BIPOC) students of medicine and other health professions and works to increase diversity in research.

History 
NMF was started by Dr. Franklin C. McLean MD, PhD, then a professor of physiology at the University of Chicago. Dr. McLean saw that the lack of opportunities for African-American physicians was a problem.

NMF started by giving scholarships to African American physicians and medical students. Over time, NMF expanded its scholarships to other groups that were underrepresented in medicine.

NMF was credited by The New York Times in decreasing of discrimination and rise of medical enrollments by minorities in 1962.

Alumni 
The NMF Alumni Council consists of the National Alumni Council, the Regional Alumni Councils and the Young Leadership Council.

The National Alumni Council was established in 2016 and represents more than 15,000 verified alumni.

References 

Medical and health organizations based in Virginia